Axios commonly refers to:
 Axios (river), a river that runs through Greece and North Macedonia
 Axios (website), an American news and information website

Axios may also refer to:

Brands and enterprises
 Axios, a brand of suspension products owned by Tenneco
 Axios Systems, an IT management software vendor

Geography
 Axios, Thessaloniki, a Greek municipality named after the river in geographical Macedonia
 Orontes River, a river in Syria, also called Axios or Axius in antiquity

Religion
 Axios (acclamation), an expression used in the Orthodox church
 Axios (organization), an Orthodox and Eastern Catholic LGBT organization
 Axios (magazine), a scholarly Orthodox Magazine published c. 1981 by a monastery of the same name located in California.

See also
Axis (disambiguation)
Axius (disambiguation)
Gnaeus Domitius Corbulo
Vardar (disambiguation)